Starbreaker or starbreakers may refer to:

Starbreaker (band), an American heavy metal/hard rock band
 Starbreaker (album), their 2005 debut
Starbreaker (comics), a fictional supervillain in comics published by DC Comics
"Starbreaker", a song by Judas Priest, from the album Sin After Sin